Joseph Hou may refer to:

Joseph Hou Jinde (1918–1994), Chinese Roman Catholic bishop
Joseph Hou Guoyang (1922–?), Chinese Roman Catholic bishop